Kazakhstan competed at the 2022 World Aquatics Championships in Budapest, Hungary from 18 June to 3 July.

Artistic swimming 

Kazakhstan entered 14 artistic swimmers.

Women

Mixed

Open water swimming

Kazakhstan entered 4 open water swimmers (2 male and 2 female )

Men

Women

Mixed

Swimming

Kazakhstan entered 5 swimmers.
Men

Women

Water polo

Summary

Men's tournament

Team roster

Group play

13th place game

Women's tournament

Team roster

Group play

Playoffs

9–12th place semifinals

Eleventh place game

References

Nations at the 2022 World Aquatics Championships
2022
World Aquatics Championships